The Hennepin Island Hydroelectric Plant is at St. Anthony Falls in Minneapolis, Minnesota.  It has historically been an important part of St. Anthony Falls Hydroelectric Development.  The plant is currently operated by Northern States Power/Xcel Energy. The facility stands on Hennepin Island near the Pillsbury "A" Mill at Saint Anthony Falls, the river's only waterfall, which powered the city's early sawmills, grist mills and other industry. There are five generating units.

NSP/Xcel renewed its license which was authorized by the Federal Energy Regulatory Commission in March 2004. One condition of the license is the creation of a recreation area to show the evolution of St. Anthony Falls. A portion of the island overlooking the falls has been made into Water Power Park, allowing the closest possible approaches to the falls. In 2008, NSP/Xcel collaborated with the University of Minnesota's St. Anthony Falls Laboratory on a new Outdoor StreamLab which improves two existing flood bypass channels to study the site's ecology and hydrology.

The plant is one of 85 contributing properties of the Saint Anthony Falls Historic District which is listed on the National Register of Historic Places.  (See full list here.)

Crown Hydro, LLC, has proposed another hydro plant for the falls, to be built on the opposite bank of the Mississippi next to the Stone Arch Bridge.

Notes

External links 

 Xcel Energy: Power Generating Facilities
Hennepin Island
Although this page is from the owner of the plant it has some blatant errors: "1882" and "arc-lights" are for another (much earlier) plant; "site of early sawmills" is for a third plant.
 St. Anthony Falls Laboratory
Outdoor StreamLab

Buildings and structures in Minneapolis
Hydroelectric power plants in Minnesota
Dams in Minnesota
Xcel Energy dams
Historic district contributing properties in Minnesota
National Register of Historic Places in Minneapolis
Industrial buildings and structures on the National Register of Historic Places in Minnesota
Energy infrastructure on the National Register of Historic Places